It's a Crazy World is the fifth studio album by American country music artist Steve Wariner. It was released in 1987 by MCA Records. Three singles were released from it, and all three reached number-one. This album peaked at #30 on Top Country Albums.

Track listing

Personnel
Richard Bennett - acoustic guitar (1,8,9)
Tony Brown - piano (5)
Paul Davis - drum programming (5), keyboards (5), background vocals (5)
Vince Gill - background vocals (3)
Emory Gordy Jr. - bass guitar (except 5 and 7)
George Grantham - tambourine (2), background vocals (2)
Owen Hale - drums (1,8,9)
John Hall - background vocals (10)
Randy Hart - DX-7 (7,10), keyboards (3), piano (6)
Lance Hoppen - background vocals (10)
David Hungate - bass guitar (7)
Dave Innis - keyboards (8)
John Barlow Jarvis - keyboards (except 5)
Bill LaBounty - synthesizer programming (9), background vocals (9)
Dave Loggins - background vocals (8)
Larrie Londin - drums (2,3,4,6,7,10)
Allyn Love - steel guitar (3,6)
Kyle Macy - background vocals (4)
J.D. Martin - background vocals (8)
Mac McAnally - acoustic guitar (2,3,4,5,7,10), keyboards (2), background vocals (2,5,6,7)
Terry McMillan - harmonica (8), tambourine (9)
Jim Photogolo - background vocals (5)
Russell Smith - background vocals (8)
Kyle Tullis - bass guitar (5)
Billy Joe Walker Jr. - acoustic guitar (3,4), electric guitar (1,2,6,7,8,9)
Steve Wariner - lead vocals (all tracks), background vocals (10), acoustic guitar (6), acoustic guitar solo (5), electric guitar solo (2,6)
Terry Wariner - background vocals (6)
Reggie Young - electric guitar (except 5)

Chart performance

Album

References

Steve Wariner albums
1987 albums
Albums produced by Jimmy Bowen
Albums produced by Tony Brown (record producer)
MCA Records albums